Goudomp is a town in the Sédhiou Region of Senegal. It is the capital of the Goudomp Department. The population in 2012 was 13,394, an increase from the 11,013 counted in 2002.

The current mayor is Abdoulaye Bosco Sadio. The town received commune status in 1996.

References

External links

Populated places in Sédhiou Region
Communes of Senegal